The Jewish religious year consists of the events, observances and liturgies observed by Jews over the course of a year.  Holidays and other observances are fixed on the Jewish, or Hebrew calendar, a lunisolar calendar, but float with respect to other calendars in widespread use, such as the Gregorian calendar.  Further information on the Jewish religious year is available in the following articles:
Hebrew calendar, the calendar basis for Jewish religious observances
Jewish holiday, describing the Jewish Sabbath, festivals, and other observances throughout the year
Weekly Torah reading, describing the annual cycle of Torah readings on the Sabbaths of the year
Jewish prayer provides a gateway to resources about other liturgical variations over the course of the year

References 

 Lindsay Jones, ed. (December 2004), Encyclopedia of Religion (2 ed.), Macmillan Reference USA,  

Jewish holy days
Jewish law and rituals
Judaism-related lists